Parliamentary elections were held in Laos on 20 March 2016. Voters were presented with a single list from the Lao Front for National Construction, dominated by the Communist Lao People's Revolutionary Party (LRPP). The LPRP won 144 of the 149 seats, with pro-government independents winning the remaining five.

Electoral system
The 149 members of the National Assembly were elected from 18 multi-member constituencies with between three and fourteen seats using the first-past-the-post system. Candidates had to gain the support of a local authority or a mass organisation to run for office, and election committees approve candidacies. Due to a rise in the country's population, the number of seats was increased from 132 in the 2011 elections.

Campaign
A total of 149 seats were contested by 211 candidates, including 50 women and 48 incumbent MPs. Much of the election campaign was focused on economic development.

Results
Of the 149 elected members, 73% were first-time MPs.

Aftermath
Following the elections, the National Assembly convened on 20 April to elect Bounnhang Vorachith as president (replacing Choummaly Sayasone) and Thongloun Sisoulith as Prime Minister, replacing Thongsing Thammavong.

References

Elections in Laos
Laos
2016 in Laos
One-party elections
Election and referendum articles with incomplete results
March 2016 events in Asia